Cyrtodactylus exercitus is a species of gecko, a lizard in the family Gekkonidae. The species is endemic to India.

References

Cyrtodactylus
Reptiles described in 2022
Reptiles of India